Rot an der Rot is a town in the district of Biberach in Baden-Württemberg in Germany. The town developed out of Rot an der Rot Abbey.

Bilder

Notables
 Wilhelm Hanser (1738–1796), composer and organist
 Julius von Roeck (1818–1884) mayor of Memmingen
 HAP Grieshaber (1909–1981), painter and graphic artist
 Gerd Leipold (* 1951), former CEO of Greenpeace International

Other people associated with the city
 Wilhelm Eiselin (* 1564 in Mindelheim; † March 28, 1588 in Rot an der Rot), Premonstratensian
 Franz Baum (1927–2016), former member of parliament
 Siegfried Rundel (1940-2009), composer and publisher
 Frank Günther (* 1947), Shakespeare translator
 Berthold Schick (* 1966), musician, lives in Rot an der Rot
 Holger Badstuber (* 1989), football player

References

Biberach (district)
Württemberg